Rudy , also known as Rudy Wielkie ("Great Rudy") or Rudy Raciborskie, is a village in the administrative district of Gmina Kuźnia Raciborska, within Racibórz County, Silesian Voivodeship, in southern Poland. The village has a population of 2,800.

With history going back to the 13th century, it is a site of a gothic Cistercian palace-monastery. There is also a narrow gauge railway station and museum in the village.

Rudy gives its name to the protected area called Rudy Landscape Park (in full: "Landscape Park of the Cistercian Landscape Compositions of Rudy Wielkie").

History
In the early 13th century a monastery was founded at the site, however, it was destroyed in the First Mongol invasion of Poland in 1241. The Cistercians rebuilt the monastery in 1252–1255. A foundation document was issued by Duke Władysław Opolski of the Polish Piast dynasty in 1258, and it was confirmed by Pope Gregory X in 1274. The Cistercians developed the village. In the early 14th century, Duke Przemysław of Racibórz funded the construction of a new church (present-day Basilica) in Rudy.

During World War II, the Germans established and operated three forced labour subcamps (E374, E588, E742) of the Stalag VIII-B/344 prisoner-of-war camp in the village. In the final stages of the war, in 1945, a German-conducted death march of prisoners of a subcamp of the Auschwitz concentration camp in Sosnowiec passed through the village towards Opava.

Sports
The local football team is LKS Buk Rudy. It competes in the lower leagues.

People 
 Viktor II. (1847-1923), Duke of Ratibor
 Viktor III. (1879-1945), Duke of Ratibor

Gallery

References

Rudy
13th-century establishments in Poland
Populated places established in the 13th century